Aspistor is a genus of sea catfishes found along the northeastern coast of South America, where they occur in marine, brackish, and fresh waters.

Species
Three recognized species are in this genus:
 Aspistor hardenbergi (Kailola, 2000)
 Aspistor luniscutis (Valenciennes, 1840)
 Aspistor quadriscutis (Valenciennes, 1840) (Bressou sea catfish)

References

Ariidae
Fish of South America
Catfish genera
Taxa named by David Starr Jordan
Taxa named by Barton Warren Evermann